Annalagraharam is a village in the Kumbakonam taluk (municipality) of the Thanjavur district in the state of Tamil Nadu in southeastern India.

Demographics 

According to the 2001 census, Annalagraharam had a total population of 6266, of which 3172 are male and 3094 female. The sex ratio was .975/1, females to males. The literacy rate was 77.76.

References 

 

Villages in Thanjavur district